is a novel by Shusaku Endo published in 1993. When he died in 1996, only two novels were chosen to be placed inside his coffin. Deep River was one of them.

Plot summary
The story traces the journey of four Japanese tourists on a tour to India in 1984. Each has different purposes and expectations. Even though the tour is interrupted when Prime Minister Indira Gandhi is assassinated by militant Sikhs, the tourists find their own spiritual discoveries on the banks of the Ganges River.

One of the tourists is Osamu Isobe. He is a middle-class manager whose wife has died of cancer. On her deathbed she asked him to look for her in a future reincarnation. His search takes him to India, even though he has doubts about reincarnation.

Kiguchi is haunted by war-time horrors in Burma and seeks to have Buddhist rituals performed in India for the souls of his friends in the Japanese army as well as his enemies. He is impressed by a foreign Christian volunteer who helped his sick friend deal with tragic experiences during the war.

Numada has a deep love for animals ever since he was a child in Manchuria. He believes that a pet bird he owns has died in his place. He goes to India to visit a bird sanctuary.

Mitsuko Naruse, after a failed marriage, realizes that she is a person incapable of love. She goes to India hoping to find the meaning of life. Her values are challenged by the awaiting Otsu, a former schoolmate she once cruelly seduced and then left. Although he had a promising career as a Catholic priest, Otsu’s heretical ideas of a pantheistic God have led to his expulsion. He helps carry dead Indians to the local crematoria so that their ashes can be spread over the Ganges. His efforts ultimately lead to his peril as he is caught in the anti-Sikh uprisings in the country. Meanwhile, Mitsuko meets two nuns from the Missionaries of Charity and begins to understand Otsu's idea of God.

Characters
 Osamu Isobe, a middle manager who looks for a girl named Rajini Puniral, the potential reincarnation of his dead wife.
 Mitsuko Naruse, a former housewife who takes a trip both as a pilgrimage and to see her ex-boyfriend Otsu as atonement for mistreating him
 Numada, a bird watcher who wants to set a bird in his possession free.
 Kiguchi, a former WWII Imperial Japanese Army soldier.
 Enami, the tour guide.
 Mr. Sanjo, a photojournalist on honeymoon with his wife.
 Mrs. Sanjo, his vapid new wife.
 Augustine Otsu, Mitsuko's former boyfriend, now a Catholic priest in Varanasi.

Film adaption
A film based on the novel (also named Fukai kawa) was made in 1995. It was directed by Kei Kumai. The film stars Kumiko Akiyoshi as Mitsuko, Eiji Okuda as Otsu, Hisashi Igawa as Isobe, Yoichi Numata as Kiguchi, and Tetta Sugimoto as Enami. Kyoko Kagawa plays Mrs. Isobe in flashbacks, while Numada becomes  Tsukada, played by Toshiro Mifune, and Kin Sugai plays his wife.

References

1993 novels
Novels by Shusaku Endo
Japanese novels adapted into films
Novels set in India